Francisco Oliveira Alves Varela (born 20 August 2000) is a Portuguese footballer who plays for C.D. Cova da Piedade  as a midfielder.

Football career
He made his professional debut for Cova da Piedade on 26 January 2020 in the LigaPro.

References

External links

2000 births
Living people
Sportspeople from Almada
Portuguese footballers
Association football midfielders
Liga Portugal 2 players
C.D. Cova da Piedade players